Johan Juansyah (born 25 October 1988 in Garut) is an Indonesian former footballer.

Club career
He is playing in the Indonesian Super League club Persatuan Sepakbola Indonesia Jepara.

International career
In 2009, Johan played to represent the Indonesia national under-23 football team in Sea Games 2009 and his debut international in senior team when Indonesia win 2-0 with Chinese Taipei at Gelora Sriwijaya Stadium.

References

External sources
 Profile at liga-indonesia.co.id
 Profile at goal.com

Indonesian footballers
1988 births
Living people
Sundanese people
People from Garut
Sportspeople from West Java
Persijap Jepara players
Persija Jakarta players
Persikabo Bogor players
PSCS Cilacap players
Liga 1 (Indonesia) players
Liga 2 (Indonesia) players
Indonesia youth international footballers
Indonesia international footballers
Association football midfielders